Mario Nuzzi, who went by the pseudonym, Mario de' Fiori (19 January 1603, in Rome – 14 November 1673, in Rome) was an Italian painter in the Baroque style. His paintings are all based around floral arrangements; hence the name Fiori (flowers).

Biography 
He was the second son of Sisto Nuzzi, a landowner from Penna in Teverina, and his wife Faustina Salini, sister of the still-life painter Tommaso Salini. In 1618, his father took the family back to Penna, where they engaged in floriculture and Mario amused himself by painting the flowers. 

This led, in 1620, to an apprenticeship in the workshop of his uncle Tommaso. Mario remained there until 1625, when his uncle died. While there, he was influenced by the works of Caravaggio, who had been one of his uncle's associates. In 1628, he married Ortensia de Curtis, from a family of English origin. They had one son.

Once established, he created amicable working relationships with Cassiano dal Pozzo and the Barberini family; all noted patrons of the arts, who not only collected but commissioned many significant works. Notably, illustrations for De florum cultura by Giovanni Battista Ferrari, which were commissioned by Cardinal Francesco Barberini. His popularity with the Barberinis led to other notable clients in the church, including Cardinal Giulio Rospigliosi (who would become Pope Clement IX), and Cardinal Mario Theodoli, who promoted his works in France. He also received orders from the banker, Agostino Chigi. During this period, his works began to show Flemish influence; especially that of Daniel Seghers.

An especially important contact was made in 1644, when he met Giancarlo de' Medici, who had just been appointed a Cardinal and was a passionate botanist. His commissions for Nuzzi inaugurated the Medici still-life collection and helped diffuse Nuzzi's works throughout Tuscany, where they influenced Giovanni Stanchi, Bartolommeo Ligozzi, Bartolomeo Bimbi and Andrea Scacciati. In 1646, he was elected a member of the Congregazione dei Virtuosi al Pantheon.

In 1648, he became a widower. Two years later, he married Susanna Passeri. Curiously, his marriage certificate gives his name as "de' Fiori". From 1651 to 1667, they had six children.

In 1657, he was finally accepted as a member of the Accademia di San Luca. After 1658, he did decorative work for Cardinal Flavio Chigi; painting flowers on mirrors and basanite columns. He also collaborated with other artists to paint flowers with figures at the Palazzo Chigi in Ariccia. These paintings represent the Four Seasons and each artist was assigned to assist with one of them: Filippo Lauri (Spring), Carlo Maratti (Summer), Giacinto Brandi (Fall) and  Bernardino Mei (Winter). They painted the figures and Nuzzi provided the flowers. Such projects made him increasingly famous and wealthy.

He died in 1673, at the age of seventy, and was interred at the Basilica of San Lorenzo in Lucina.

References

Further reading 
 Laura Laureati, Mario Nuzzi detto Mario de' Fiori, in La Natura morta in Italia, 2 volumi, Milano 1989 (II vol).
 Emilio Lucci, Mario Nuzzi detto Mario de' Fiori. Un pittore di origini umbre a Roma, in Studi di storia dell'arte, 2004, n. 15, pp. 275–288.
 Gianluca Bocchi - Ulisse Bocchi, Mario Nuzzi detto Mario de' Fiori in Pittori di natura morta a Roma. Artisti italiani 1630-1750, Viadana 2004, pp. 76–82.

External links 

 Brief biography and works by Nuzzi @ the Museo del Prado
 More works by Nuzzi @ ArtNet

1603 births
1673 deaths
17th-century Italian painters
Italian male painters
Italian Baroque painters
Italian still life painters
People from the Province of Pescara